The Big Boss World Tour was a concert tour by reggaeton singer Daddy Yankee to promote his album El Cartel: The Big Boss. This was his second arena tour in the United States and his first official world tour. The tour started in Agust 24, 2007 at the Coliseo de Puerto Rico and was expected to end on December 8, 2007 in Cali's Estadio Pascual Guerrero. However, due to the success of his soundtrack Talento de Barrio, more dates were added and the tour extended to 2008.

Background 
Barrio Fino become the best selling reggaeton album of all time selling more than three million copies worldwide and was one of the few albums in Spanish to sell more than one million copies in the United States. After his Barrio Fino World Tour was concluded, he started to work on his next album. On April 16, 2007, MTV and Billboard announced the dates of the arena tour in the United States and mentioned that he would also perform 20-plus concerts in Mexico and South America through early December. In those markets, he would play both arenas and 30,000 to 40,000-capacity stadiums. Initial plans of the tour was to visited 15 countries and 40 cities in Latin America by the end of 2007. However, this plans wasn't materialized due unknown reasons.

Overview 
In the United States, Billboard reported that ticket prices would range from $40 to $100. Some of the concerts were sold out. However, some sources reported that the concert in Madison Square Garden received a poor audience. In his native Puerto Rico, both concerts were sold out and in Bolivia the media reported over 50,000 fans in the venue. In Torreon, Mexico, over 7,500 showed up to the concert.

In the Dominican Republic, the media reported that both concerts were sold out. In Santo Domingo, the attendance was more than 8,000. In Maturi, Venezuela broke attendance records at the venue with more than 30,000 fans.

Tour dates

Box Office Data

Cancelled Concerts

Notes

References 

2007 concert tours
2008 concert tours
Daddy Yankee concert tours